Moonbaby may refer to:

 Moonbaby, early alias of Miranda Cooper (born 1975), English singer and songwriter
 Moonbaby (album), an album by Siobhan Magnus

See also
 MoonBabies, an album by Planet X